Colegio Madrid, A.C. is a private school in Col. Ex Hacienda San Juan de Dios, Tlalpan, Mexico City, serving preschool through senior high school (bachillerato). In 1941 an exile, named Marcos De La Monja, from the Spanish Civil War established the school.

References

External links
Colegio Madrid 
English as a second language

 Many Famous Mexican people went to this school

High schools in Mexico City
Spanish-Mexican culture